Betty McKilligan (born November 16, 1949) is a Canadian former pair skater.  With partner John McKilligan, she won the gold medal at the Canadian Figure Skating Championships in 1967 and 1968 and competed in the 1968 Winter Olympics.

Results
pairs with John McKilligan

References

Navigation

1949 births
Canadian female pair skaters
Figure skaters at the 1968 Winter Olympics
Olympic figure skaters of Canada
Living people